Alpha Pi Omega Sorority, Inc. is the oldest historically Indigenous national sorority in the United States. It is the largest Indigenous Greek letter organization, with 24 chartered chapters across nine states and the District of Columbia.

History
Alpha Pi Omega Sorority was founded on Sept. 1, 1994, at the University of North Carolina-Chapel Hill by four Native women. The founders, now known to as the Four Winds, are Shannon Brayboy (Lumbee), Jamie Goins (Lumbee), Amy Locklear (Lumbee and Coharie), and Christie Strickland (Lumbee). Before forming the group, they sought and received the approval of elder women from the various tribes of North Carolina. 

The sorority's founding principles are traditionalism, spirituality, education, and contemporary issues. Its first pledge class was called the Fifteen Warrior Women.The sorority was incorporated with the State of North Carolina in 1995 and expanded to additional campuses. 

With more than 130 tribes represented by its members, the sorority has more than 900 sisters nationwide. Nationally, the sorority is governed by a thirteen-member board known as the Grand Keepers of the Circle. Grand Keepers are elected to two-year terms and meet bi-monthly.

Symbols 
The sorority's colors are fire red, new grass green, and maize yellow. Its mascot is the Queen Bee, while its jewel is the amethyst. Its tree is the cedar and its flower is the dogwood. The Alpha Pi Omega motto is "My Sister As Myself".

Activities
Alpha Pi Omega preserves Native American traditions by celebrating and practicing cultural and spiritual heritage, such as hosting stickball games. At the same time, it supports a network for college students and professionals in modern society. The sorority's annual national convention is called the Grand Gathering.

Its permanent national philanthropy is the National Indian Education Association, as of 2010. Individual chapters also participate in local fundraising events such as Walk a Mile in Her Shoes or Remember the 10 Run. The Washington State University chapter held sexual assault awareness classes and LGBTQ+ ally training, while the Oregon State University chapter held a fundraiser for the Humane Society.

Membership
Interested women may join at the undergraduate or post-undergraduate level. Collegiate women must have completed at least one full-time academic term, have a 2.8 GPA or higher, and have no previous affiliation with any social sorority. Women interested in joining a professional chapter must have completed a bachelor's degree or higher and have no previous affiliation with any social sorority.

Chapters
APO starts potential chapters as expansion chapters or honey pots. After a year, the expansion chapter becomes a provisional chapter. Chapters are chartered at the sorority's annual Grand Gathering. Graduate chapters are for women who have received their undergraduate degrees. 

Active chapters are indicated in bold. Inactive chapters are shown in italic.

Undergraduate chapters

Notes

Graduate chapters

See also
 Cultural interest fraternities and sororities
 List of social fraternities and sororities
 Phi Sigma Nu fraternity

References 

Student organizations established in 1994
Fraternities and sororities in the United States
Native American organizations
1994 establishments in North Carolina
Native American history of North Carolina